Astrid Hänschen (born 4 January 1967) is a German archer. She competed in the women's individual and team events at the 1992 Summer Olympics.

References

External links
 

1967 births
Living people
German female archers
Olympic archers of Germany
Archers at the 1992 Summer Olympics
Sportspeople from Hamburg
20th-century German women